"Follow Your Arrow" is a song recorded by American country music singer and songwriter Kacey Musgraves. The song is featured on her major label debut album, Same Trailer Different Park. It was released on October 21, 2013, as the album's third single. It was written by Musgraves, Brandy Clark and Shane McAnally. It was named Song Of The Year at the 2014 CMA Awards. Rolling Stone ranked 'Follow Your Arrow' number 39 on its list of '100 Greatest Country Songs of All Time'.

Content
Suggesting that any given choice will elicit criticism from others, the narrator states that one's best course is to remain true to oneself ("follow your arrow"). One line of the song includes a support of the gay community.

The song is in the key of F major with a main chord pattern of F – D – B– G – C and a vocal range between F and C. It is in a 4/4 time signature with a moderate tempo.

Music video
The music video was directed by Honey and Kacey Musgraves and premiered in December 2013.

Live performances
Musgraves performed the song on November 6 at the 2013 Country Music Association Awards. On January 26, Musgraves performed the song at the 56th annual Grammy Awards held at the Staples Center in Los Angeles.

Critical reception
"Follow Your Arrow" has been widely acclaimed by most critics and fans since its release, despite receiving initial criticism from some conservative groups.

Billboard listed "Follow Your Arrow" at number 2 on their list of 20 Best Songs of 2013, saying that "you didn't have to be a hardcore country fan to boogie along to Kacey Musgraves' exuberant call to make lots of noise and kiss lots of boys — or lots of girls, if that's something you're into." Rolling Stone Magazine ranked the song 8# in their list of 100 Best Songs of Decade 2010s on December 4, 2019. At the 2013 Country Music Awards, they censored the famous line "Roll up a joint" because they deemed it too controversial for primetime television. "Follow Your Arrow" received mixed reviews from conservatives due to some of the song's lyrics, as they claimed the country tune was "an attack on Christians", while others called it a "sign of [a] shift in country music" due to the song's positive reference to homosexuality.

Chart performance
"Follow Your Arrow" debuted at number 56 on the US Billboard Country Airplay chart for the week of November 2, 2013. It also debuted at number 28 on the US Billboard Hot Country Songs chart for the week of November 23, 2013, and at number 60 on the US Billboard Hot 100 chart for the week of February 15, 2014. In the week of February 15, 2014, the song also jumped from number 26 to number 10 on the Billboard Hot Country Songs chart, giving Musgraves her first top ten single as a recording artist on that chart. As of June 2014, the song has sold 471,000 digital copies in the US.

Charts

Weekly charts

Year-end charts

Certifications

References 

2013 singles
2013 songs
Kacey Musgraves songs
Songs about cannabis
Songs written by Shane McAnally
Songs written by Kacey Musgraves
Songs written by Brandy Clark
Mercury Nashville singles
LGBT-related songs
Songs with feminist themes
Song recordings produced by Luke Laird
Song recordings produced by Shane McAnally